The Registration Act (2 Ann c.7;  long title An Act for registering the Popish Clergy) was an Act of the Parliament of Ireland passed in 1704, which required all "Popish" (Roman Catholic) priests to register at their local magistrates' court, to pay two 50-pound bonds to ensure good behavior, and to stay in the county where they registered.

The act was one of a series of Penal Laws passed after the Williamite War to protect the victorious Protestant Ascendancy from a church seen as loyal to the defeated Jacobites and to foreign powers. Its second section stated that if an Irish Catholic priest was to convert to the established Church of Ireland, he would receive a 20-pound stipend, levied on the residents of the area where he had last practised.  Unregistered clergy were to depart Ireland before the 20 July 1704 and any remaining after 24 June 1705 would be deported.  Any that returned would be punished as under the  Banishment Act 1697 (as high treason). These were sought by freelance "priest hunters".

Amendment and repeal
A 1704 act (4 Anne c.2) amended the Registration Act, Banishment Act and Popery Act, to close a loophole whereby they had not applied to priests ordained after the original act first came into force. The 1704 act, originally set to expire after the 1708–09 session of Parliament, was made permanent in that session. The Roman Catholic Relief Act 1782 provided that these acts' provisions could not apply to a priest who had registered and taken an oath of allegiance. Daniel O'Connell drafted a comprehensive Catholic Emancipation bill in the 1820s which would have repealed all these acts; in the event the Roman Catholic Relief Act 1829 was more limited and the acts were not formally repealed until the Statute Law Revision (Ireland) Act 1878.

References

Sources

 
 
 2 Ann c.7 pp.31–32 – "An Act for registering the Popish clergy" (1703)
 4 Ann c.2 pp.71–72 – "An Act to explain and amend an act, An Act for  the popish clergy" (1705)
 8 Ann c.3 pp.190–216 – "An Act for explaining and amending an act , An Act to prevent the further growth of popery" (1709)

Citations

Acts of the Parliament of Ireland (pre-1801)
1704 in law
1704 in Ireland
Penal Laws in Ireland